Peppertones (Hangul: 페퍼톤스), is a Korean rock band formed in 2003 by Shin Jae-pyung and Lee Jang-won. The pair met as computer science students at KAIST in Daejeon. The band's first EP album A Preview was released in 2004. They released their first album, Colorful Express, in 2005.

Members 
 Shin Jae-pyung (신재평) a.k.a. Sayo - guitar, vocals (born June 19, 1981)
 Lee Jang-won (이장원) a.k.a. Noshel - bass, vocals (born August 30, 1981)

History 
Shin Jae-pyung and Lee Jang-won both graduated from the Department of Computer Science at KAIST. The duo met as members of KAIST's Folk Club and Rock Club. Originally, Shin Jae-pyung was part of a pop band, while Lee Jang-won was part of a folk band. Lee Jang-won's band then was named "Triangular Rice Balls and Konjac Jelly" (삼각 주먹밥 과 곤약젤리) because he was eating just these two food items to save money to buy a guitar. Their respective bands took part in KAIST's creative song festival, which Lee Jang-won's band won. Following that, Shin Jae-pyung's band recruited Lee Jang-won. 

The band built its reputation by performing live in Hongdae clubs with Deb and Westwind, who played the guest vocal roles. They released their first EP called A Preview in 2004 with the independent music label Cavare Sound.   They were recognized by critics as the winner of the "Best Dance & Electronic Song" award for their song Superfantastic from their first album Colorful Express (2005) at the 4th Korean Music Awards in 2007. In September 2008, they moved to their current label, Antenna Music.

Sayo and Noshel are the stage names they used at the beginning of their debut, and they are now active under their real names. At the beginning of their career, their songs are sung by guest vocalists, notably Deb and Westwind. In their first album, Colorful Express (2005), they began singing on their own, with Shin mostly occupying the main vocal role and Lee as backing vocals.

Lee earned a Master of Business Engineering degree from KAIST's Business School and worked as an intern for Mirae Asset Management in late 2009. He is currently a doctorate student at KAIST's Graduate School of Culture and Technology. He is also currently active as a cast member of the TV show Problematic Men since 2015.

Shin was a radio DJ for the Our Beautiful Night Radio program on EBS FM from May 30 to August 28, 2011. He has also written songs for other artists, most notably K-pop girl group f(x), singer-actress Park Ji-yoon, and singer Baek A-yeon.

Discography

Studio albums

Live albums

Extended plays

Digital singles 
 April Funk (2005)
 Thank You (2013)
 Campfire (2015)
 Someone who gives me happiness (2021)
 Tangerine (2021)

Soundtrack appearances

Compilation appearances

Filmography

Awards

See also 
 Antenna Music

References

External links 
 
 
 Peppertones at Jpop Asia
 Antenna Music official site

K-pop music groups
KAIST alumni
South Korean musical duos
South Korean electronic music groups
South Korean singer-songwriters
Antenna Music artists
Korean Music Award winners